Andrew Hall is an English hedge fund manager who served as the head of commodities trading firm Phibro LLC and the head of his own hedge fund Astenbeck Capital. In 2019, the Financial Times described him as the "most successful oil trader of his generation."

Early life and education
Hall was brought up in Feltham and educated at Hampton Grammar School. He has an MA in chemistry from Oxford University, and an MBA from INSEAD.

Career
Upon graduation from Oxford in 1973, Hall joined British Petroleum where he served in various posts, the last as Vice President of BP North America Trading in New York.

Hall left BP and joined Phibro Energy in 1982. After Hall took charge of Phibro’s energy unit in 1991, the company shifted away from moving physical cargoes and into trading paper derivatives. Hall joined the Board of Directors of Salomon Inc., the parent company of Phibro in 1991. He later became CEO of Phibro in 1992.

As the head of a then subsidiary of Citigroup, Hall's compensation drew criticism about Wall Street pay in the aftermath of subprime-related bank bailouts. Citigroup sold Phibro LLC to Los Angeles-based Occidental Capital for $370 million, in part due to the pay controversy. Hall earned about $100 million in 2008. Also in 2008, while still at Citigroup, he launched Astenbeck Capital Management, a hedge fund which raised more than $3.0 billion.

In 2017, Hall announced the closing of Astenbeck Capital Management's main fund.

Art collection
Andrew Hall and his wife Christine are internationally renowned art collectors. In 2007, he and his wife Christine Hall founded The Hall Art Foundation, whose mission is to make available postwar and contemporary art works from its own collection and that of the Hall family for the enjoyment and education of the public. The Hall Art Foundation operates two museum spaces in Derneburg, near Hannover, Germany and in Reading, Vermont. The Hall Art Foundation also has an exhibition partnership with the Massachusetts Museum of Contemporary Art, in North Adams, Massachusetts and collaborates with other public institutions around the world to organize exhibitions and facilitate loans from its own collection and that of the Halls.

References

External links
 "Citigroup’s Andrew Hall Has Castle, Demands Bonus," New York Magazine, April 29, 2009
 "How Citi's Andrew Hall Made $100 Million Last Year," Time magazine, October 19, 2009

Living people
Alumni of the University of Oxford
British hedge fund managers
British stock traders
People from Feltham
British art collectors
Philanthropists from Connecticut
1951 births